Tolan is a surname. Notable people with the surname include:

Bobby Tolan (born 1945), American baseball player
Brentwood S. Tolan (1855–1923), American architect
Eddie Tolan (1908–1967), American athlete and sprinter
John H. Tolan (1877–1947), U.S. Representative from California
John V. Tolan, historian of religious and cultural relations between the Arab and Latin worlds in the Middle Ages
Johnnie Tolan (1917–1986), American racecar driver
Michael Tolan (born 1925), American actor
Peter Tolan (born 1958), American television producer, director, and screenwriter 
Stephanie S. Tolan, American author
Thomas J. Tolan (1830–1883), American architect
Tolan (medieval poet), south Indian poet associated with "kudiyattam"

See also
 Tollan, Mesoamerican city
 Diphenylacetylene